Carisa Zhavia Ward (born March 6, 2001) is an American singer from Norwalk, California. Her mother Bobbi Jo Black was the singer of the metal band Xenoterra. She rose to fame after competing in singing reality television show The Four: Battle for Stardom, which premiered on Fox on January 4, 2018, where she was one of four finalists. In May 2018, Ward signed a deal with Columbia Records, and was featured on Diplo, French Montana, and Lil Pump's single "Welcome to the Party" for the Deadpool 2 soundtrack. She started her first tour on March 6, 2019, and later that year would perform a cover of "A Whole New World" with Zayn Malik for the Aladdin soundtrack.

Discography

Extended plays

Singles

As a lead artist

As a featured artist

Promotional singles

Filmography

Awards and nominations

Tours

Headlining 

 2019: The 17 Tour

Notes

References 

2001 births
Living people
21st-century American women singers
American contemporary R&B singers
Columbia Records artists
Participants in American reality television series
Singers from Los Angeles